Justice (R) Majida Rizvi is the first woman judge of a High Court in Pakistan. She practiced in the High Courts and Supreme Court and taught Law in Hamdard School of Law. As a writer she specialized in legal issues pertaining to rights of women and children, and is associated with various organizations for the removal of all discrimination against women and supporting human rights.

She retired as Judge of the Sindh High Court and worked as the Chairperson, Sindh Human Rights Commission.

Justice Majida Razvi Profile on SHRC Website https://www.shrc.org.pk/team-1.php

References

External links
Sindh Human Rights Commission
Pakistan: Interview with Justice (retd.) Majida Rizvi
An Interview with Justice Majida Rizvi
Justice Majida Rizvi: Treat honour killing as homicide

Living people
Pakistani women judges

Pakistani feminists
Pakistani legal writers
Sindh Muslim Law College alumni
Year of birth missing (living people)